De Zalmhaven, also referred to as Zalmhaven Toren, is a project that includes a  residential tower in Rotterdam, the Netherlands. Other parts of the project are two buildings of 70m each. The project was approved by the city in February 2010.

The tower and a second office building were designed by Dam & Partner architects, with Claus en Kaan Architecten designing a residential unit. It is one of the tallest residential towers in Europe and the tallest building in the Netherlands.

History 
In September 2016, the Rotterdam city council approved the plan. After fifteen years of preparation, construction started on 25 October 2018. With Zalmhaven I, the Zalmhaven has a height of 215 meters. The building itself is 203 m and the mast takes up the last 12 m.

On 15 December 2020, the construction of Zalmhaven II and III reached the highest point. Zalmhaven I reached its highest point in September 2021 and the entire project is projected to be completed in 2022.

Layout and design 
De Zalmhaven contains 452 apartments and penthouses, 33 townhouses, a parking garage, offices, commercial spaces and a restaurant. The townhouses have a private roof terrace and the apartments and penthouses all have one or more outdoor spaces. The basement accommodates a five-story parking garage with 456 spaces. An inner garden will be realized in the lobby. A roof garden will be realized on the parking garage that is only accessible to the residents of De Zalmhaven. The apartments and penthouses in De Zalmhaven II and III have their own entrance at Gedempte Zalmhaven, but residents also use the facilities in De Zalmhaven I.

References

External links
Official Gedempte Zalmhaven website
 

Skyscrapers in Rotterdam
Residential skyscrapers in the Netherlands